Toh Chin Chye  (10 December 1921 – 3 February 2012) was a Singaporean politician who served as Deputy Prime Minister of Singapore between 1959 and 1968. Toh is widely recognised as one of the founding fathers of Singapore. He was also one of the founders of the People's Action Party (PAP), which has governed the country continuously since independence.

Toh was a prominent member of the country's first generation of political leaders after Singapore became independent in 1965. He had served as Deputy Prime Minister between 1959 and 1968, Minister for Science and Technology between 1968 and 1975, and Minister for Health between 1975 and 1981. 

He had also served as Chairman of the People's Action Party between 1954 and 1981, Leader of the House between 1959 and 1968, and Vice-Chancellor of the University of Singapore (now the National University of Singapore) between 1968 and 1975. 

After Toh had resigned from the Cabinet in 1981, he continued to serve as a Member of Parliament (MP) on the backbenches.

Early life and career
Toh attended St George's Institution in Taiping, and Anglo-Chinese School in Ipoh before graduating from Raffles College (now the National University of Singapore) in 1946 with a diploma in science. 

He went on to further his studies at the University of London and received a PhD in physiology from the National Institute for Medical Research in 1953.

Toh began his career as an academic where he was a reader in physiology at the University of Singapore (now the National University of Singapore) between 1958 and 1964. He served as Vice-Chancellor of the University of Singapore while serving as Minister for Science and Technology between 1968 and 1975 concurrently.

Political career

Toh became politically active during his time as a university student in London, when he served as Chairman of the Malayan Forum, an anti-colonial group for students from Malaya and Singapore where they meet regularly for discussions and debates on the future of the Malayan region.

Toh was among the founding members of the People's Action Party (PAP) and served as the party's chairman from its formation in 1954 to 1981, however during a short period in 1957, the leftists in the party, who dominated the common membership in 1957, took over the party leadership. 

The founding members were subsequently restored when many of the leftist leaders were arrested by Chief Minister Lim Yew Hock in his anti-communist crackdown, allowing for the restoration of the original "basement group" of Toh, Lee Kuan Yew and Goh Keng Swee, et al. to the party's Central Executive Committee (CEC). Following this, Toh implemented a cadre system to prevent from the newcomer "ordinary members", including leftist sympathisers, from having undue influence over the membership of the CEC. Toh was also a key member of Lee Kuan Yew's faction in their fight against their rivals within the party.

Toh contested in Rochor as a PAP candidate during the 1959 general election and won.

Following the PAP's victory at the 1959 general election, the members of the party's CEC voted to decide whether Lee, as the party's Secretary-General, or the party's Treasurer, Ong Eng Guan, who served as Mayor of the City Council between 1957 and 1959, should take up the newly-created office of Prime Minister. The vote was tied, and Toh, as the party's Chairman, used his casting vote in favour of Lee.

Toh was a tenacious fighter in the battle against the Barisan Sosialis, a communist party formed by defunct members from the PAP. He managed to defeat Barisan Chairman Lee Siew Choh by a mere 89 votes in the 1963 general election, his narrowest electoral victory.

Toh held several Cabinet portfolios prior and subsequent independence of Singapore, including Deputy Prime Minister between 1959 and 1968, Minister for Science and Technology between 1968 and 1975 and Minister for Health between 1975 and 1981. He also served as Vice-Chancellor of the University of Singapore between 1968 and 1975. His stint at the university drew mixed reactions from staff and students. While his role to reorient the university's focus to suit the fledgling nation's needs was applauded, he was perceived as authoritarian, when he clamped down on student demonstrations and political activities.

Toh stepped down from the Cabinet and as the party's Chairman in 1981. He served a further two parliamentary terms as a vocal backbencher, during which time he criticised his own party on a regular basis. He retired from Parliament at the 1988 general election.

Personal life

False accusation
In 1996, a front-page article in Singaporean tabloid The New Paper claimed that Toh had killed a pedestrian in a hit-and-run accident while driving drunk.  The actual perpetrator was a different man also called Toh Chin Chye, one of nine people sharing the name in Singapore.  The reporter who filed the story was fired, with two newsroom editors demoted, and the paper paid Toh $300,000 in damages.

Retirement
Toh spent his last years away from the public eye. The Straits Times featured Toh twice, in 2005 and 2006 respectively, once on 2 May 2005, where he was seen being assisted by two men and a walking stick as he walked to pay his last respects to former President Wee Kim Wee. In February 2006, Toh was featured in The Straits Times again, paying his last respects to the late former Deputy Prime Minister S. Rajaratnam at his home in Chancery Lane.

Death and legacy
Toh died in his sleep at his home in Greenview Crescent, Bukit Timah on 3 February 2012 at 9:30am Singapore Standard Time (UTC+08:00). He was 90 years of age. He is survived by his son-in-law and four grandchildren aged 4 to 15.
He was given a private funeral according to his wishes on 7 February 2012 at the Mandai Crematorium. As a mark of respect for his contributions to Singapore, his coffin was draped in the national flag and borne on a ceremonial gun carriage to the crematorium. State flags at all Government buildings were flown at half-mast on the day of his funeral.

Contributions
Toh was generally considered one of the founding fathers of Singapore that came along with Lee Kuan Yew, Goh Keng Swee and S. Rajaratnam, for helping to lead Singapore during the nation's formative years.

Majulah Singapura was chosen by Toh as the national anthem of Singapore. In 1959, he headed the team that designed the coat of arms and state flag of Singapore.

Honours
Toh was conferred the Order of Nila Utama (First Class) in 1990.

References

	

	

1921 births
2012 deaths
People's Action Party politicians
Members of the Parliament of Singapore
Malaysian emigrants to Singapore
People who lost Malaysian citizenship
Naturalised citizens of Singapore
Singaporean politicians of Chinese descent
Singaporean people of Hokkien descent
National University of Singapore alumni
Recipients of the Darjah Utama Nila Utama
Members of the Dewan Rakyat
Members of the Legislative Assembly of Singapore
Ministers for Health of Singapore
Deputy Prime Ministers of Singapore
Singaporean independence activists